Stenalia gridelli is a beetle in the genus Stenalia of the family Mordellidae. It was described in 1949 by Franciscolo.

References

gridelli
Beetles described in 1949